Byron Deangelo-Tarone Mitchell (born October 31, 1973) is an American former professional boxer who fought from 1996 to 2012. He was the Lineal and two-time WBA super middleweight champion, winning the titles in 1999 and 2001.

Amateur career
September 1991 Byron Mitchell first started boxing at Johnny Trawick's Wolfpack Boxing Gym in Ozark, Alabama.  Mitchell was the 1996  National Golden Gloves Middleweight Champion

Pro career
He turned professional in 1996 for Don King and won the World Boxing Association and Lineal Super Middleweight titles in 1999 after defeating the southpaw Frankie Liles (32-1) by KO in the 11th round. Later that year, he drew with Bruno Girard and lost the title to Girard the next year. He recaptured the WBA belt the following year by beating Manny Siaca then made defenses against Siaca, in a rematch, and Julio César Green before losing a split decision in a unification bout to Sven Ottke in Germany, 2003.

Later that year he lost to WBO title holder Joe Calzaghe by KO in the 2nd round.  He became the first man to floor the Welshman but was later stopped on his feet. He retired after the fight, then after more than four years away from the pro game returned to the ring in 2007.  As of February 2010, Mitchell's comeback had netted him three wins and two losses, His last loss was to current WBA light heavyweight champion Beibut Shumenov, who won and lost two razor thin controversial decisions to Gabriel Campillo.
His last win was against 30-7-0 David Telesco.

See also
List of super middleweight boxing champions
List of WBA world champions

References

External links

Byron Mitchell - CBZ Profile

|-

Living people
Middleweight boxers
Sportspeople from Orlando, Florida
World boxing champions
1973 births
American male boxers